This is a list of museums in Colombia.

 Museo de Historia Natural, Universidad Nacional de Colombia, Bogotá
 Vinyl Museum (Museo del disco), Zipacon.

Museums by Department

Bogotá and Cundinamarca 
Colonial Art Museum of Bogotá
 Colombian National Museum, Bogotá.
 Casa de la Moneda de Colombia, Bogotá.

Gold Museum, Bogotá.
 Maloka Museum, Bogotá.
Children's Museum of Bogotá
Museum of Contemporary Art of Bogotá
Archeological Museum of Pasca

Antioquia 

 Museum of Antioquia, Medellín

Cauca 

 Popayán Archdiocesan Museum of Religious Art

Quindio 

 Quimbaya Museum, Armenia

Norte Santander 

 Norte de Santander and City of Cucutá Museum
 Pamplona Colonial House Museum
Antón García de Bonilla Museum

Magalena 

 Rodadero Sea Aquarium and Museum

Santander 

 San Jose de Suaita Cotton Mill Museum

See also 

 List of museums by country

Colombia
Museums
Museums in Colombia
Colombia
Museums